Esther Pasztory is a professor emerita of Pre-Columbian art history at Columbia University. From 1997 to her retirement in 2013 she held the Lisa and Bernard Selz Chair in Art History and Archaeology.  Among her many publications are the first art historical manuscripts on Teotihuacan and the Aztecs.  She has been the recipient of a Guggenheim Fellowship (1987–88) and a senior fellow of the board of Dumbarton Oaks.

Biography and education
Pasztory was born in Hungary and immigrated to the United States in 1956 after the anti-Communist revolutions.  She was initially educated at Vassar College but later transferred to Barnard College where she received her B.A. in art history in 1965.  She remained at Columbia University and received her Ph.D. from the institution in 1971 for a dissertation entitled "The Murals of Tepantitla, Teotihuacan". Her research into the Great Goddess of Teotihuacan has been influential and provided the basis for many later art historical studies.

Publications
 1974, The iconography of the Teotihuacan Tlaloc 
 1978, Middle Classic Mesoamerica, A.D. 400-700 
 1983, Aztec art 
 1997, Teotihuacan : an experiment in living
 1998, Pre-Columbian art 
 2005, Thinking with things : toward a new vision of art 
 2010, Jean-Frédéric Waldeck : artist of exotic Mexico 
 2017, Visual Culture of the Ancient Americas : Contemporary Perspectives

References

External links 
 Esther Pasztory Papers at the Newberry Library

American art historians
Women art historians
Columbia University faculty
Living people
American women historians
Hungarian emigrants to the United States
Barnard College alumni
Columbia University alumni
Year of birth missing (living people)
21st-century American women